Newspaper formats vary substantially, with different formats more common in different countries. The size of a newspaper format refers to the size of the paper page; the printed area within that can vary substantially depending on the newspaper.

In some countries, particular formats have associations with particular types of newspaper; for example, in the United Kingdom, there is a distinction between "tabloid" and "broadsheet" as references to newspaper content quality, which originates with the more popular newspapers using the tabloid format; hence "tabloid journalism".

Trends

In a recent trend, many newspapers have been undergoing what is known as "web cut down", in which the publication is redesigned to print using a narrower (and less expensive) roll of paper. In extreme examples, some broadsheet papers are nearly as narrow as traditional tabloids.

Sizes and aspect ratios
 Broadsheet  (1.255 aspect ratio)
 Nordisch  (1.425 aspect ratio)
 Rhenish around  (1.486 aspect ratio)
 Swiss (Neue Zürcher Zeitung)  (1.484 aspect ratio)
 Berliner  (1.492 aspect ratio)
 During its Berliner phase, The Guardians printed area was  (1.544 aspect ratio).
 Tabloid  (1.536 aspect ratio)
 Demitab (half tabloid)  1.3125 aspect ratio. "Magazine format", though many magazines are larger. Used by The Economist.

Comparison with ISO 216 (1.414)
A2 
B3 
C3 
A3 
A4

References 

 
Newspaper terminology
Papermaking